Newbie is a populated place in Annandale South, near Annan.  It is home to a pharmaceutics plant belonging to Phoenix Chemicals of Liverpool.

The Annandale Way Great Trail has a trailhead at Newbie Barns, a small collection of dwellings in Newbie.

References

Annandale and Eskdale
Dumfriesshire
Populated places in Dumfries and Galloway